Paul Weller is the debut solo album by the English singer-songwriter Paul Weller, released in 1992.

Background

After disbanding The Style Council and leaving label Polydor in 1989, Weller formed The Paul Weller Movement in 1990, releasing a single, "Into Tomorrow", on his own Freedom High record label, in October 1991.  Its success - reaching #36 in the UK chart - led to Weller being offered a new record deal with Go! Discs.

Recorded over the two years before the album's original Japanese release, this album represents something of a return to Weller's musical roots, with "Into Tomorrow" and "Uh Huh Oh Yeh" in particular being heavily influenced by 60s R&B. According to Weller, "'Uh Huh Oh Yeh' – and, after it, the Stanley Road album – was me revisiting my roots. I hadn't been down to Woking in a long time. That was the first time, in the early '90s, when I was finding my feet again." The album as a whole retained some of the funk influences displayed by The Style Council, particularly on "I Didn't Mean To Hurt You" and "Remember How We Started". However, the explicit political leanings of The Style Council are abandoned, with the lyrical themes visited on the album being much more personal.

Release

The album entered the UK Albums Chart on 12 September 1992, reaching number eight and staying on the chart for seven weeks.

Before the UK edition of the album, it had already been released in Japan on 29 April 1992. The track listing differs from subsequent releases, and the running order is altered. The track "New Thing" (a different recording of "Here's a New Thing" from the "Into Tomorrow" single) was replaced by "The Strange Museum" on all other versions. Until 2009, "New Thing" was unique to this release.

In addition to "Into Tomorrow", included on the album, two further singles were released from the album - "Uh Huh Oh Yeh", on 15 August 1992, reaching #18, and "Above The Clouds" on 10 October 1992, reaching #47.

A deluxe edition of the album was released on 26 October 2009 and reached #88 in the UK Album Chart.

Track listing
All songs written by Paul Weller, except where noted.

Personnel 
 Steve White - Drums, Percussion
 Jacko Peake - Saxophones, Flute, Backing Vocals
 Paul Weller - Guitar, Vocals, Bass (1, 2, 3, 4, 5, 6, 7, 8, 10, 11), Keyboards, Percussion
 Dr. Robert - Bass (12), Backing Vocals (3,8)
 "Brother" Marco Nelson - Bass (9)
 Dee C. Lee - Backing Vocals (3, 5, 11, 12)
 Camelle Hinds - Backing Vocals (4, 12)
 Carleen Anderson - Backing Vocals (12)
Technical
Chris Bangs - co-producer on "Above The Clouds"
Martin "Max" Heyes, Paul Gomersall, Robin Black - engineer
Nick Knight - photography

References
 Paul Weller Official Site
 Info on the original Japanese edition

1992 debut albums
Go! Discs albums
Paul Weller albums